Songs of Scotland is a 1955 album by Jo Stafford. It was released on January 1, 1955 on the Columbia label and features Stafford backed by the Paul Weston Orchestra. The lyrics are all taken from traditional Scottish poetry, many from the work of Robert Burns, with the music written by Alton Rinker.

Stafford and Weston re-joined Capitol Records in 1961. The album was later released by Weston and Stafford's own record label, Corinthian.

Track listing 

 My Heart's in the Highlands
 John Anderson, My Jo
 Flow Gently Sweet Afton
 Ye Banks and Braes of Bonnie Doon    
 Molly's Meek, Molly's Sweet     
 Comin' Through the Rye
 My Love Is Like a Red, Red Rose  
 Green Grow the Rashes, O    
 Annie Laurie
 My Jean
 The Bonnie Lad That's Far Away  
 Auld Lang Syne

References

1955 albums
Jo Stafford albums
Corinthian Records albums
Albums arranged by Paul Weston
Capitol Records albums
Columbia Records albums
Albums conducted by Paul Weston